"A String of Pearls" is a 1941 song composed by Jerry Gray with lyrics by Eddie DeLange.  It was notably recorded by Glenn Miller and His Orchestra on RCA Bluebird that November, becoming a #1 hit. The song is a big band and jazz standard.

Background
Glenn Miller and His Orchestra recorded "A String of Pearls" on November 8, 1941 in New York, which was copyrighted and published by The Mutual Music Society, Inc., ASCAP. It was released as an RCA Bluebird 78 single, B-11382-B, backed with "Day Dreaming", in 1941 by Glenn Miller and His Orchestra. "Day Dreaming" was the A side.

The personnel for "A String of Pearls": Saxes: Babe Russin, Tex Beneke, Wilbur Schwartz, Ernie Caceres, Al Klink; Trumpets: John Best, R. D. McMickle, Billy May, Alec Fila; Trombones: Glenn Miller, Jimmy Priddy, Paul Tanner, Frank D'Annolfo; Piano: Chummy MacGregor; String Bass: Edward "Doc" Goldberg; Guitar/Cornet: Bobby Hackett; Drums: Moe Purtill. Bobby Hackett performed the cornet solo on the original Glenn Miller recording.

The record was ranked No. 1 in the US for two weeks in 1942 on the Billboard Best Sellers chart in a chart run of 21 weeks.

Cover versions
Connee Boswell's recording for Decca Records in 1942 was among the first vocals of the song ever waxed. 
The song was also recorded by Benny Goodman, The Benny Goodman recording was released as a V-Disc 78 single as No. 409A by the U.S. War Department in April, 1945.
Among other artists include: 
Harry James
Woody Herman
Ritchie Lee
Kurt Edelhagen
Barney Kessel
Floyd Cramer
Dick Schory's Percussion Pops Orchestra
Ernie Fields
James Last
Herb Miller
Geoff Love and His Orchestra
Felix Slatkin
Billy Maxted's Manhattan Jazz Band
Billy Vaughn and His Orchestra
Hugo Montenegro
Marty Gold
Ray McKinley and the New Glenn Miller Orchestra
Ted Heath and His Orchestra
Enoch Light and the Light Brigade, Les and Larry Elgart
The Royal Air Force Dance Orchestra
The Freddie Mitchell Orchestra
Lawrence Welk, Joe Bob's Nashville Sound Company
Diane Courtney, and Narciso Yepes
Jazz pianist Stan Kenton recorded a live version with Red Kelly on bass and Lennie Niehaus on alto saxophone on the At the Las Vegas Tropicana album on Blue Note Records released in 1996.

In popular culture and media
The song was featured in the 1953 Glenn Miller biopic The Glenn Miller Story starring James Stewart.
The song appeared in Mike Nichol's 1971 film Carnal Knowledge.
"A String of Pearls" was featured on a 1972 episode of The Lawrence Welk Show in the episode entitled "Songs of the 40s".
The instrumental version appeared on a 1976 episode of the CBS series The Carol Burnett Show.
The song was played on the radio in the 1977 film Oh, God! starring John Denver and George Burns.
The song was in the 1986 comedy Tough Guys starring Burt Lancaster and Kirk Douglas.
The Glenn Miller recording was in a bedroom scene in the 1987 action thriller The Sicilian.
The Glenn Miller recording was featured in the 1993 comedy film Dennis the Menace starring Walter Matthau and Mason Gamble.
A recording by the Glenn Miller Orchestra appeared in the 2002 environmentalism documentary Blue Vinyl.
The Glenn Miller recording was featured on The Notebook soundtrack album in 2004.
The song was featured on the soundtrack of the 2008 film Revolutionary Road starring Kate Winslet and Leonardo DiCaprio.

References

Sources
 Butcher, Geoffrey (1997).  Next to a Letter from Home. North Pomfret, Vermont: Trafalgar Square. 
 Miller, Glenn (1943). Glenn Miller's Method for Orchestral Arranging. New York: Mutual Music Society.  ASIN: B0007DMEDQ
 Simon, George Thomas (1980). Glenn Miller and His Orchestra. New York: Da Capo paperback. .
 Simon, George Thomas (1971). Simon Says. New York: Galahad. 
 Schuller, Gunther (1991). The Swing Era: The Development of Jazz, 1930–1945, Volume 2. New York: Oxford University Press.

External links
 1942 RCA Bluebird recording on the Jazz Anthology website

|- style="text-align: center;"

Glenn Miller songs
1941 songs
1942 singles
Songs with lyrics by Eddie DeLange
Songs with music by Jerry Gray (arranger)
Jazz compositions
Pop standards
1940s jazz standards